The Velasco class of unprotected cruisers was a series of eight cruisers built during the 1880s for service with the Spanish Navy.  They were named after Luis Vicente de Velasco.

Description 
The Velasco class consisted of two slightly different subclasses.  The first two ships, Velasco and Gravina, built by the Thames Ironworks & Shipbuilding & Engineering Co. Ltd. at Leamouth, London in the United Kingdom, had fewer but heavier guns and were slightly faster than the next six, which were built at various yards in Spain.  The class took a long time to complete, with the two British-build ships being laid down in 1881 and the last Spanish built one not being completed until 1889. The ships had one rather tall funnel, an iron hull, and barque rigging.  They were unarmored.

History 
The Velasco-class cruisers generally were assigned to colonial service. They were an ill-fated class, with two lost at sea and three more sunk during the Spanish–American War. The three survivors lasted into the early 20th century, with the last one stricken in 1927.

Ships in class

Velasco 
Completed in 1881, Velasco was in the Philippines at the outbreak of the Spanish–American War in April 1898 and was sunk in the Battle of Manila Bay on 1 May 1898.

Gravina 
Completed in 1881, Gravina was sent to the Philippines, where she sank in a typhoon in 1884.

Infanta Isabel 
Completed in 1885, Infanta Isabel was the longest lived of the class, undergoing a reconstruction in 1911 and not being stricken until 1927.

Isabel II 
Completed in 1887, Isabel II saw action during the Spanish–American War in the Second and Third Battles of San Juan, and was stricken in 1907.

Cristobal Colon 
Completed in 1889, Cristobal Colon was lost off Cuba in October 1895.

Don Juan de Austria 
Completed in 1887, Don Juan de Austria was in the Philippines at the outbreak of the Spanish–American War in April 1898 and was sunk in the Battle of Manila Bay on 1 May 1898. Salvaged, repaired and in 1900 commissioned into American Navy.

Don Antonio de Ulloa 
Completed in 1886, Don Antonio de Ulloa was in the Philippines at the outbreak of the Spanish–American War in April 1898 and was sunk in the Battle of Manila Bay on 1 May 1898.

Conde del Venadito 
Completed in 1888, Conde del Venadito was stricken around 1905

References
Chesneau, Roger, and Eugene M. Kolesnik, Eds. Conway's All The World's Fighting Ships 1860–1905. New York, New York: Mayflower Books Inc., 1979. .
Gray, Randal, Ed. Conway's All The World's Fighting Ships 1906–1921. Annapolis, Maryland: Naval Institute Press, 1985. .
Nofi, Albert A. The Spanish–American War, 1898. Conshohocken, Pennsylvania:Combined Books, Inc., 1996. .

External links 

The Spanish–American War Centennial Web Site
Department of the Navy: Naval Historical Center: Online Library of Selected Images: Spanish Navy Ships: Conde del Venadito (Cruiser, 1888–1902)

Cruiser classes